Cuce (Cyrillic: Цуце) is a historical tribe (pleme) and region in Montenegro, located in the area of the Katunska nahija from Old Montenegro.

History
The toponym Cuce is first mentioned in 1431 in documents from Kotor, then again in a chrysobull of the Cetinje Monastery from the end of the 15th century. In Ottoman defters from 1521 and 1523, Cuce is mentioned as a village. The majority of inhabitants migrated to Cuce in the 16th and 17th century, from Old Herzegovina and Old Kuči. In 1718, after the Peace of Passowitz, the Cuce along with 9 other tribes of the Katun nahiya, became de facto independent from the Ottoman Empire.

In 1829 Bjelice struggled against Ozrinići and Cuce, two neighboring tribes, and Petar I Petrović-Njegoš sent Sima Milutinović Sarajlija and Mojsije to negotiate peace among them.

Smail-aga Cengic wrote a letter in 1838 to Njegos, complaining about the Cuce who had raided Ottoman territory.

Traditionally, the Vojvode (Dukes) of tribe were from the House of Krivokapić and the Serdari (Counts) were from the House of Perović. In the case of lower Cuce, Knez (Prince) Rogan founded the House of Roganović.

Anthropology
Jovan Cvijić extensively studied the tribes of Old Montenegro. Cuce are divided into Upper Cuce and Lower Cuce. Most of the inhabitants of Upper Cuce descend from Herzegovina, while the inhabitants of Lower Cuce generally descend from the Kuči tribe.

Kovači
Kovačevići
Krivokapići, brotherhood originally from Old Herzegovina
Banićevići  
Šakići
Zviceri, originally from Old Kuči
Simovići
Živkovići
Mijanovići
Perovići
Đuričići (oldest family in Cuce)
Vujadinovići
Roganovići
Bigovići
Markovići
Stevovići
Ćosovići
Perišići
Popovići
Jovovići
Ivanovići, brotherhood originally from Old Herzegovina, descending from Šćepan Ivanov; today all four brotherhoods are included in the Krivokapići; slava of St. Nicholas
Mijatovići
Ivanovići
Zukovići
Đukanovići, base in Krajište
Đurovići
Cucovići
Otaševići
Tomanovići, originally from Old Kuči

The Djer-didije is a dance of the Cuce.

People
Nikac Tomanović, Montenegrin chief
Slavko Perović, famous Montenegrin politician.
Ilarion Roganović, Metropolitan of Montenegro (1860-1882)
Knez (Prince) Rogan, Montenegrin clan chief of Lower Cuce & eponymous founder of house Roganović 
Krsto Zrnov Popović, leader of the 1919 Christmas Uprising
Radovan Krivokapić, Montenegrin football player
Miodrag Krivokapić, former Montenegrin football player
Goran Krivokapić, Montenegrin classical guitarist
Miodrag Živković (politician), Montenegrin politician
Zdravko Krivokapić, Montenegrin politician
Dragoljub Đuričić, prominent Serbian and Montenegrin musician
Miko Đuričić, prominent Montenegrin photographer
Nenad Knežević Knez, popular Montenegrin singer, by ancestry
Ranko Krivokapić, Montenegrin politician, by ancestry
Miodrag Krivokapić, Serbian actor; by paternal ancestry
Boris Krivokapić, Serbian professor of Public International Law and Human rights and author; by paternal ancestry
Milorad Krivokapic, Serbian-Hungarian handballer; by paternal ancestry
Milorad Krivokapić, former Montenegrin water polo player, by ancestry
Petar Banićević, Montenegrin actor
Ana Pešikan, former minister of science and technology in the Government of Serbia
Blažo Pešikan, former Montenegrin footballer

References

External links
Branko Krivokapić: Crnogorsko Pleme Cuce, O Sebi i Drugima

 
Tribes of Montenegro